Freedom Now is a Washington, D.C.-based non-profit, non-partisan organization that protects individuals and communities from government repression and defends human rights through direct legal support, targeted high-leverage advocacy, and capacity-building analysis and assistance.

Its approach is to use focused legal, political, and public relations advocacy efforts designed to compel the release of individuals deprived of their liberty in violation of the rights and freedoms enshrined in the Universal Declaration of Human Rights,
the International Covenant on Civil and Political Rights, and other international human rights instruments.

A small organization with limited resources, Freedom Now works closely with other human rights organizations and lawyers to identify high-impact cases that would benefit from the organization's approach.

Notable campaigns 
Freedom Now represents 38 prisoners of conscience worldwide, including:
Abdulhadi Alkhawaja (Bahrain)
Loujain Alhathloul (Saudi Arabia)
G.N. Saibaba (India)
Buzurgmehr Yorov (Tajikistan)

Notable past campaigns 

Prisoners of conscience previously represented by Freedom Now include:
Eskinder Nega (Ethiopia)
Óscar Elías Biscet, M.D. (Cuba)
Father Thadeus Nguyen Van Ly (Vietnam)
Andrei Sannikov (Belarus)
Lapiro de Mbanga (Cameroon)
Dr. Yang Jianli (China)

UN Working Group on Arbitrary Detention Database 
In 2011, Freedom Now partnered with the UN and Thomson Reuters to create the UN Working Group on Arbitrary Detention Database. The online database includes over 1,000 legal decisions from 1992 to the present. It is the only searchable, complete database of Working Group decisions available. Freedom Now continues to monitor and update the database.

References

External links
 Freedom Now homepage

Human rights organizations based in the United States